is a motoring journalist and racing driver from Japan.

After he won the Japanese Formula 3 championship in 1990, he failed to pre-qualify for two Formula One Grands Prix with Coloni in 1991 as a late-season replacement for Pedro Chaves.  He raced in Indy Lights in the mid-90s, and in CART briefly in 1999 for Walker Racing with a best finish of 14th. In 1997, he tested a Formula One prototype, the F105, for Dome F1 at Suzuka and other Japanese race tracks, but Dome F1 never entered a Formula One Grand Prix.

Hattori competed regularly at the Japanese Touring Car Championship, winning the 1996 title with a Mooncraft Honda Accord after collecting five wins and three second-place finishes in 12 starts.

In 1991 driving a Nissan Skyline R32 GT-R for Nismo, Hattori, David Brabham and Anders Olofsson won the Spa 24 Hours.

He is not related to compatriot and fellow racer Shigeaki Hattori. He has been one of the presenters of the Best Motoring video series.

Racing record

Complete Japanese Formula 3000 Championship/Formula Nippon results
(key) (Races in bold indicate pole position) (Races in italics indicate fastest lap)

Complete JGTC/Super GT Results 
(key) (Races in bold indicate pole position) (Races in italics indicate fastest lap)

Japanese Touring Car Championship (-1993) Class results

Complete Japanese Touring Car Championship (1994-) results
(key) (Races in bold indicate pole position) (Races in italics indicate fastest lap)

Complete Formula One results
(key)

Complete International Formula 3000 results
(key)

American open–wheel racing results
(key)

Indy Lights

CART

References
Profile at oldracingcars.com

Japanese racing drivers
Japanese Formula One drivers
Japanese Formula 3 Championship drivers
Champ Car drivers
Indy Lights drivers
Japanese IndyCar Series drivers
International Formula 3000 drivers
Japanese Formula 3000 Championship drivers
Formula Nippon drivers
Super GT drivers
Japanese Touring Car Championship drivers
1966 births
Living people
24 Hours of Le Mans drivers
24 Hours of Spa drivers
Coloni Formula One drivers
Dandelion Racing drivers
Team LeMans drivers
Mugen Motorsports drivers
Walker Racing drivers
Team Kunimitsu drivers
Nakajima Racing drivers
Andretti Autosport drivers
Nürburgring 24 Hours drivers